Fernridge is a small rural settlement located 4 km northwest of Masterton, New Zealand. The area has a mixture of farms, horticultural smallholdings and lifestyle blocks.

Demographics 

Upper Plain had a population of 1,224 at the 2018 New Zealand census, an increase of 138 people (12.7%) since the 2013 census, and an increase of 180 people (17.2%) since the 2006 census. There were 438 households. There were 639 males and 585 females, giving a sex ratio of 1.09 males per female. The median age was 46.9 years (compared with 37.4 years nationally), with 249 people (20.3%) aged under 15 years, 156 (12.7%) aged 15 to 29, 576 (47.1%) aged 30 to 64, and 243 (19.9%) aged 65 or older.

Ethnicities were 93.4% European/Pākehā, 11.8% Māori, 2.2% Pacific peoples, 1.7% Asian, and 2.7% other ethnicities (totals add to more than 100% since people could identify with multiple ethnicities).

The proportion of people born overseas was 14.0%, compared with 27.1% nationally.

Although some people objected to giving their religion, 52.2% had no religion, 39.5% were Christian, 0.2% were Buddhist and 1.2% had other religions.

Of those at least 15 years old, 213 (21.8%) people had a bachelor or higher degree, and 174 (17.8%) people had no formal qualifications. The median income was $35,600, compared with $31,800 nationally. The employment status of those at least 15 was that 483 (49.5%) people were employed full-time, 156 (16.0%) were part-time, and 21 (2.2%) were unemployed.

Education

References

Masterton District
Wairarapa
Populated places in the Wellington Region